Zhang Ziyang (born 1 January 2001) is a Chinese swimmer. He competed in the men's 4 × 200 metre freestyle relay at the 2020 Summer Olympics.

References

External links
 

2001 births
Living people
Chinese male freestyle swimmers
Olympic swimmers of China
Swimmers at the 2020 Summer Olympics
Place of birth missing (living people)
21st-century Chinese people